Richard Steven Turner (born 15 March 1968) is a former New Zealand rugby union player. He was a member of the New Zealand national side, the All Blacks, in 1992, playing two matches, both of them internationals.
Turner lives north of Auckland now, is co-owner of a construction company and a commentator for Sky Sport.

References

1968 births
Living people
People educated at Napier Boys' High School
New Zealand rugby union players
New Zealand international rugby union players
Hawke's Bay rugby union players
North Harbour rugby union players
Rugby union number eights
New Zealand expatriate sportspeople in Italy
Expatriate rugby union players in Italy
New Zealand expatriate sportspeople in Japan
Expatriate rugby union players in Japan
New Zealand sportspeople of Samoan descent
Rugby union players from Napier, New Zealand